William Pirie (born 2 April 1949) is a former Scottish footballer who played as a forward.

Career
Pirie commenced his senior Scottish football career with Huntly FC of the Highland Football League before transferring to his home town Scottish First Division League Club, Aberdeen FC. 
However, Pirie is best known for his time with Dundee from 1976 to 1980, where he made 112 league appearances (138 total), scoring 93 goals in the process (106 total), with 44 goals in his first season with the club remains a club record and secured for him the 1977 Player of the Year award. Prior to his stint with Dundee, Pirie had spells with South African side Arcadia Shepherds, Scottish sides Huntly, Arbroath and Aberdeen, and moved to Australia after to play with APIA Leichhardt and Sydney Olympic. Pirie became a member of Dundee's Hall of Fame in 2016, and received the Legends Award.

Honours 
Dundee

 Scottish First Division: 1978–79

References

Scottish footballers
1949 births
Living people
Dundee F.C. players
Huntly F.C. players
Arbroath F.C. players
Aberdeen F.C. players
Scottish Football League players
Footballers from Aberdeen
Association football forwards
Scottish expatriate footballers
Expatriate soccer players in Australia